Charles Mortimer (born 14 April 1949) is an English former professional motorcycle short-circuit road racer and race-school instructor. He competed in the Grand Prix motorcycle road racing world championships from 1969 to 1979. He remains the only competitor to have won FIM Grand Prix races in the 125, 250, 350, 500 and 750 world championship classes.

Motorcycle racing career

Born in Shere, Surrey, UK, Mortimer is the son of Charles Mortimer Senior, a former motorcycle road racer and proprietor of the Charles Mortimer Race School based at Brands Hatch race circuit, Kent. The school was originally named in 1963 as the Beart-Mortimer racing school, with engine tuner Francis Beart being a partner to Mortimer Senior which ended in 1965 due to Beart's other business involvements. From 1966 the venues included Cadwell Park, Silverstone and Mallory Park. 

Mortimer began racing in 1965 on a Greeves Silverstone as used by the race school. At 18 years of age in 1967, Mortimer was one of the school's instructors, with Paul Smart being another. Both were competitive riders sponsored by Charles Senior, riding from a stable of machines consisting of RDS Greeves 250s, a Bultaco 125 and an Aermacchi 350. He competed for most of his career as a privateer riding Yamaha motorcycles. When Mortimer won the 1972 500cc Spanish Grand Prix on a Yamaha, it marked the first 500cc Grand Prix victory for the Japanese manufacturer. He had his best Grand Prix season in 1973 when he finished second to Kent Andersson in the 125cc world championship. Mortimer also competed successfully at the Isle of Man TT, with eight victories at the event. In 1976, he won the Macau Grand Prix.

In the 1970s Mortimer operated a race school and ran a business in Reading, Berkshire importing motorcycle parts . As of 2013 he is running a transportation company specialising in transportation of motorcycles. His brother Robin Mortimer had a long career in motor sport. When he died in 2007, he was manager of RPM Motorsport with his son Alex as driver in GT class.

Grand Prix motorcycle racing results

(key) (Races in bold indicate pole position; races in italics indicate fastest lap)

Sources:

References

1949 births
Living people
People from the Borough of Guildford
British motorcycle racers
English motorcycle racers
500cc World Championship riders
350cc World Championship riders
250cc World Championship riders
125cc World Championship riders
Isle of Man TT riders